Acenocoumarol is an anticoagulant that functions as a vitamin K antagonist (like warfarin). It is a derivative of coumarin and is generic, so is marketed under many brand names worldwide.

References

External links
 
 
 
 
 

Vitamin K antagonists
Nitrobenzenes
Coumarin drugs
4-Hydroxycoumarins